Nguyễn Văn Tâm (16 October 1895 – 23 November 1990) served as Prime Minister of the State of Vietnam, a political entity created by the French in an attempt to regain control of the country. He held that office from June 1952 to December 1953.

Early life
Born on 16 October 1895 in Tây Ninh Province during the French colonial period, Nguyễn Văn Tâm was originally a school teacher who was picked by the French in the early 1940s to be the District Chief of Cai Lậy, in Cochinchina. Here in the Mekong Delta, he had already earned the nickname Tiger of Cai Lậy as a notorious torturer of peasants during the revolts of the 1930s.

He is the paternal grandfather of Jonathan Van-Tam, Deputy Chief Medical Officer for England.

Career
After the August Revolution, following the Japanese surrender in 1945, Tâm was imprisoned by the new Viet Minh authorities for his crimes against the people but was soon freed by the returning French military.

He was among the government ministers presented on June 1, 1946 at the proclamation of the "Republic of Cochinchina"--a first, abortive, attempt of the French to create a post-colonial client state.  "Premier" Nguyen van Tinh was so humiliated by the French that after six months he hanged himself. When in 1949, in agreement with the Bảo Đại the French created the State of Vietnam, Tâm was sent north as governor of Tonkin to do battle with the communist-insurgent Democratic Republic of Vietnam. In June 1952 he became Prime Minister while his son, Nguyễn Văn Hinh, was appointed Chief of Staff of the French auxiliary Vietnamese National Army. He resigned his premiership on 12 January 1954 by prince Bửu Lộc.

From 1955 he lived in exile in the United States.

References 

1895 births
1990 deaths
People from Tây Ninh province
Prime Ministers of South Vietnam
Nguyen dynasty officials